Piridocaine is a local anesthetic.

See also
 Piperocaine

References

Local anesthetics
Benzoate esters
Piperidines
Anilines